Hassan Ali Al-Mosawi (born 21 September 1984) is a Bahraini former footballer who played as a defender for Bahrain in the 2004 AFC Asian Cup. He played club football for Riffa SC and Manama Club.

References

Living people
Bahraini footballers
Bahrain international footballers
Association football defenders
1984 births
Riffa SC players
Manama Club players
2004 AFC Asian Cup players
Place of birth missing (living people)